Tetulbaria Union is a union parishad situated at Gangni Upazila,  in Meherpur District, Khulna Division of Bangladesh. There are 10 villages and 6 mouzas in the union.

References

External links
 

Unions of Gangni Upazila
Unions of Meherpur District
Unions of Khulna Division